Herewardia is a genus of sea snails, marine gastropod mollusks in the family Pyramidellidae, the pyrams and their allies.

Species
Species within the genus Herewardia include:
 Herewardia gabrielae Peñas & Rolán, 2017
 Herewardia kesteveni (Hedley, 1907)
 Herewardia microstriae Peñas & Rolán, 2017
 Herewardia osmagnum Peñas & Rolán, 2017

References

 Peñas A. & Rolán E. (2017). Deep water Pyramidelloidea from the central and South Pacific. The tribe Chrysallidini. ECIMAT (Estación de Ciencias Mariñas de Toralla), Universidade de Vigo. 412 pp.

External links
 Ponder W. F. (1985). A review of the Genera of the Rissoidae (Mollusca: Mesogastropoda: Rissoacea). Records of the Australian Museum supplement 4:  221 Note: Figures 75 C,D and E,F are interverted in Ponder (1985: 109); it is figure 75 C,D (not E,F) that represents Herewardia kesteveni
 To World Register of Marine Species

Pyramidellidae